Machilipatnam mandal is one of the 25 mandals in Krishna district of the Indian state of Andhra Pradesh. It is under the administration of Machilipatnam revenue division and the headquarters are located at Machilipatnam town. The mandal is bounded by Bantumilli, Pedana, Gudur, Ghantasala, Challapalli and Koduru mandals.

Demographics 

 census, the mandal had a population of 238,962. The total  
population constitute, 118,820 males and 120,142 females —a sex ratio of 1011 females per 1000  
males. 21,272 children are in the age group of 0–6 years, of which 11,037 are boys and 10,235 are girls. The average literacy rate stands at 78.62% with 171,144 literates.

Towns and villages 

 census, the mandal has 29 settlements. It includes 1 town and 28 villages in the mandal. Chinnapuram is the most populated village and Potlapalem is the least populated village in the mandal.

The settlements in the mandal are listed below:

Note: M-Municipality

Government and politics 

Machilipatnam mandal is under Machilipatnam (Assembly constituency), which in turn represents Machilipatnam (Lok Sabha constituency) of Andhra Pradesh. The present MLA representing Machilipatnam (Assembly constituency) is Perni Venkataramaiah(Nani) of Yuvajana Sramika Rythu Congress Party.

See also 
List of villages in Krishna district

References 

Mandals in Krishna district